Ferrocenium hexafluorophosphate is an organometallic compound with the formula [Fe(C5H5)2]PF6.  This salt is composed of the cation [Fe(C5H5)2]+ and the hexafluorophosphate anion.  The related tetrafluoroborate is also a popular reagent with similar properties.  The cation is often abbreviated Fc+ or Cp2Fe+.  The salt is deep blue in color and paramagnetic.

Ferrocenium salts are one-electron oxidizing agents, and the reduced product, ferrocene, is relatively inert and readily separated from ionic products.  The ferrocene–ferrocenium couple is often used as a reference in electrochemistry.  In acetonitrile solution that is 0.1 M in NBu4PF6, the Fc+/Fc couple is +0.641 V with respect to the normal hydrogen electrode.

Preparation and structure
Commercially available, this compound may be prepared by oxidizing ferrocene with ferric salts followed by addition of hexafluorophosphoric acid.

The compound is monoclinic with well-separated cation and anion; the  may rotate freely. The average Fe-C bond length is 2.047 Å, which is virtually indistinguishable from the Fe-C distance in ferrocene.

References

Ferrocenes
Hexafluorophosphates
Oxidizing agents